Jundla is a town in the Karnal district of the Indian state of Haryana about 15 kilometers.

References

Villages in Karnal district